Barbora Krejčíková and Kateřina Siniaková defeated Anna Danilina and Beatriz Haddad Maia in the final, 6–7(3–7), 6–4, 6–4 to win the women's doubles tennis title at the 2022 Australian Open. It was their fourth major title together.

Elise Mertens and Aryna Sabalenka were the reigning champions, but Sabalenka did not participate. Mertens partnered Veronika Kudermetova, but they were defeated in the semifinals by Krejčíková and Siniaková.

Mertens was in contention for the world No. 1 doubles ranking, but Siniaková retained the top ranking by reaching the semifinals.

Haddad Maia became the first Brazilian woman to reach a major doubles final since Maria Bueno at the 1968 US Open.

Seeds

Draw

Finals

Top half

Section 1

Section 2

Bottom half

Section 3

Section 4

Other entry information

Wild cards

Protected ranking

Alternates

Withdrawals
Before the tournament
  Paula Badosa /  Elena Rybakina → replaced by  Anna Bondár /  Oksana Kalashnikova
  Chan Hao-ching /  Monica Niculescu → replaced by  Madison Brengle /  Tatjana Maria
  Beatriz Haddad Maia /  Nadia Podoroska → replaced by  Anna Danilina /  Beatriz Haddad Maia
  Anna Kalinskaya /  Marta Kostyuk → replaced by  Marta Kostyuk /  Dayana Yastremska
  Desirae Krawczyk /  Bethanie Mattek-Sands → replaced by  Danielle Collins /  Desirae Krawczyk
  Astra Sharma /  Ajla Tomljanović → replaced by  Anna Karolína Schmiedlová /  Kimberley Zimmermann
  Mayar Sherif /  Renata Voráčová → replaced by  Katarzyna Piter /  Mayar Sherif
  Wang Xinyu /  Zheng Saisai → replaced by  Elixane Lechemia /  Ingrid Neel

References

External links 

2022
2022 WTA Tour
Women's Doubles